Elmopalooza! is a Sesame Street special that aired on ABC on February 20, 1998. It was taped in the middle of the 29th season of Sesame Street and featured songs by celebrity guests.

About the show
The special begins with an announcer (Jerry Nelson) introducing a special Sesame Street musical show live from Radio City Music Hall, along with the celebrity guest stars. Kermit the Frog introduces the Sesame Street Muppets as they enter the theater for tonight's special show to celebrate the 30th anniversary of Sesame Street.

In the dressing room, Prairie Dawn gets Jon Stewart prepared to host the show, along with the show crew to work behind the scenes and operate the stage. Elmo visits Jon to wish him good luck, but just as he closes the door, Jon warns him that it's broken and it won't open once it's shut, but it's too late.

Meanwhile, over on Sesame Street, Gordon, Susan, Bob, Gina, and Mr. Handford are waiting for a limousine to pick them up to Radio City, but are surprised to see Grover as their chauffeur, as well as a chicken serving food.

Back in the studio, David Alan Grier reminds Jon that he's on in 30 seconds, but Jon says he, Prairie, and the crew can't come out since the door's stuck, much to David's surprise. Telly worries about something terrible going to happen if Jon can't get out of the dressing room, and thinks everyone will be sad and the economy will collapse and "the country will be doomed!". Elmo says he'll take care of everything by hosting the show, and the rest of the Muppets will be the crew. With ten seconds left, The Count manages to count down the seconds himself until showtime.

On stage, Elmo tells the audience that he will be subbing for Jon, due to technical doorknob difficulties. As he speaks, the Two-Headed Monster argues over the camera. David tells Elmo to introduce the first song, but not before he finds who ate the script. Elmo sees Cookie walking by, burping chewed paper bits out of his mouth. Then, The Fugees, Big Bird, and Snuffy perform "Just Happy to Be Me".

After the song, an elephant wants to be in the show. He decides to dance and calls himself the "Lord of the Elephants". Meanwhile, Grover's limo stops at a snowy landscape to pick up some penguins, much to the adults' confusion. Back in the studio, David hires Biff to use a jackhammer to make the door unstuck, but it goes out of control. Elmo then introduces the next song: Gloria Estefan singing "Mambo I, I, I" with Rosita, Maria, Luis, and the Oinker Sisters.

Elmo gets Telly to be a comical doctor. Telly nervously "checks up" on Elmo, who ends up laughing when he's tickled. David tells him to introduce the next song: The Count and The Mighty Mighty Bosstones singing "Zig Zag Dance".

Big Bird brings in Richard Belzer to help get the door unstuck, but he needs help from his stuntman Sparky, who runs to the door and hits it with his head, but still no success. Then, Shawn Colvin and Ernie sing "I Don't Want To Live On The Moon."

Jon Stewart tries digging his way out of the studio, as Chris Rock enters the picture. He tries to get them out, but what he didn't know was that the door is stuck. After an insult from Oscar, he decides to fill in on hosting duty. But when Prairie insists that he cannot tell any dirty jokes, he instead decides to go back to his seat, leaving Oscar interested in his mud jokes. Meanwhile, Grover's limo ends up lost in Roswell, New Mexico, leaving the adults unhappy, when a UFO appears in front of them and a Martian joins in the carpool, much to their surprise. Then, En Vogue, Cookie Monster, Zoe, Frazzle, and the Two-Headed Monster perform "I Want A Monster To Be My Friend."

Backstage, as Elmo checks the script, he realizes that he doesn't know how to read. David comes to tell Elmo that the tape machine is malfunctioning so they can't do the next song. Elmo then decides that he's going to sing a song that will bring down the house. He calls in the big cheese, Rosie O'Donnell, and asks her if she wants to sing with Elmo. Rosie accepts and they both head to the stage, singing "Nearly Missed", with a prop rainbow, sun, and shooting star displaying. As they finish, Rosie accidentally knocks Elmo backstage, creating a mess on the stage. Elmo decides to surrender. Then, Kermit the Frog and Jimmy Buffett sing "Caribbean Amphibian".

Elmo, thinking he has ruined the show, walks away from the studio as Big Bird tells him he can't give up and the show won't go on without him, but Elmo leaves anyway. Back in the dressing room, Prairie Dawn, Jon Stewart, and the human crew pull a rope tied to the doorknob as hard as they could, but it's still no use. Jon then asks David to play "One Small Voice", but Prairie points out that the song's tape is stuck in with them.

Meanwhile, Grover's limo has successfully made it to Radio City Music Hall, but Grover wants to find another parking space, and the adults beg him not to go around the block again and they hurriedly leave the vehicle.

Back inside, David huddles with some Muppets and discuss on how they should get the door unstuck. Bert says he has a pepper shaker and salt shaker just in case someone sneezes so hard it knocks down anything. He hands it to Oscar and sprinkles it on his worm Slimey, who lets out a sneeze so big it knocks the door down. Big Bird retrieves the tape and runs with it to the control room. The video of Kenny Loggins singing "One Small Voice" plays.

Now that Jon, Prairie, and the human crew are free, Prairie declares that everyone gets to sing during the grand finale. Jon, David, Elmo, Big Bird, Oscar, Cookie Monster, the adults, and many other Muppets sing a medley of Sesame Street songs. During the credits, the entire cast of characters and guest stars sing the Sesame Street Theme.

Songs
 * "Just Happy to Be Me" - The Fugees
 * "Mambo I, I, I" - Gloria Estefan
 * "The Zig Zag Dance" - The Mighty Mighty Bosstones
 * "I Don't Want to Live on the Moon" - Shawn Colvin and Ernie
 * "I Want a Monster to Be My Friend" - En Vogue
 * "Nearly Missed" - Rosie O'Donnell and Elmo
 * "Caribbean Amphibian" - Jimmy Buffett and Kermit the Frog
 * "One Small Voice" - Kenny Loggins and Big Bird and couple of kids
 * Songs (medley) - Jon Stewart, David Alan Grier, Elmo and the cast, **"Rubber Duckie" - Ernie,**"ABC-DEF-GHI" - Big Bird.**"I Love Trash" - Oscar the Grouch,**"C Is For Cookie" - Cookie Monster, **"The People in Your Neighborhood" - Lexine, Michael, Tarah, Bob, Gina, Gordon, Mr. Handford, Susan
 * "Can You Tell Me How to Get to Sesame Street?" (during end credits) - all performers and Muppets

Soundtrack

Cast

Humans
 Alison Bartlett-O'Reilly as Gina
 Ruth Buzzi as Ruthie
 Emilio Delgado as Luis
 Loretta Long as Susan
 Sonia Manzano as Maria
 Bob McGrath as Bob
 Roscoe Orman as Gordon
 David Smyrl as Mr. Handford
 Tarah Lynne Schaeffer as Tarah

Special guest appearances
 Tyra Banks - Herself
 Richard Belzer - Himself
 Tony Bennett - Himself (archive footage)
 The Mighty Mighty Bosstones - Themselves
 Shawn Colvin - Herself
 Cindy Crawford - Herself
 Gloria Estefan - Herself 
 The Fugees - Themselves
 David Alan Grier - Himself
 Kenny Loggins - Himself 
 Madonna - Herself (archive footage)
 Conan O'Brien - Himself 
 Rosie O'Donnell - Herself 
 Chris Rock - Himself
 Jada Pinkett Smith - Herself (archive footage)
 Will Smith - Himself (archive footage)
 Jon Stewart - Himself 
 En Vogue - Themselves 
 Jimmy Buffett - Himself
 Lamb Chop (archive footage)
 Richard Harris - Himself (archive footage)
 Andy Richter - Himself
 Martin Short - Himself
 Jeff Garlin - Himself

Sesame Street Muppet Performers
 Kevin Clash as Elmo
 Caroll Spinney as Big Bird and Oscar the Grouch
 Steve Whitmire as Kermit the Frog and Ernie
 Frank Oz as Bert, Cookie Monster, and Grover
 Jerry Nelson as Count von Count, Biff, Two-Headed Monster (Left Head), and Announcer
 David Rudman as Baby Bear, Sparky the Stuntman, Penguin, and Two-Headed Monster (Right Head)
 Fran Brill as Zoe and Prairie Dawn
 Joey Mazzarino as Horatio the Elephant
 Carmen Osbahr as Rosita
 Alice Dinnean as Penguin
 Martin P. Robinson as Mr. Snuffleupagus, Slimey the Worm, and Telly Monster
 Bryant Young as Rear End of Mr. Snuffleupagus

Additional Muppets performed by Brad Abrell, Pam Arciero, Julianne Buescher, Lisa Buckley, Kevin Carlson, Stephanie D'Abruzzo, Eric Jacobson, John Kennedy, Peter Linz, Rick Lyon, Noel MacNeal, Jim Martin, Drew Massey, Don Reardon, Joe Selph, John Tartaglia and Matt Vogel.

Merchandise
The CD and cassette was released on March 3, 1998. The special was released on VHS and DVD on April 14, 1998.

External links

Sesame Street features
1990s American television specials
1998 television specials